The Cloth of St Gereon is a mural tapestry of a repeat pattern with a decorative motif of a bull being attacked by a griffin, a fantastic creature with the body of a lion and the head and wings of an eagle. The Cloth of St Gereon is regarded as the oldest or second oldest known European tapestry still existing, dating to the early 11th century, compared to the Överhogdal tapestries, which in 2005 were redated to the same period, or a little later. A number of European museums hold sections of the original cloth, which was cut into fragments in the 19th century.

Description 
The seven-color tapestry shows medallions with bulls and griffins in combat. It was probably adapted from Byzantine or Syrian silk textiles. The motifs of the tapestry could also have derived from Sassanian textiles found in Cologne. The addition of oriental themes in the framing reveals a first attempt at variety.

The border design and background are probably the inspiration of Europe, not oriental. They are similar to 11th-century illuminated manuscripts of Cologne and Western Europe. There are no other examples of tapestry similar to this that survive other than the oldest tapestry panel in the cathedral of Halberstadt depicting "Abraham and the Archangel Michael", which was probably woven around 1175 A.D.

The style of design, which is strong in oriental and Byzantine character, is often also found in woven silks of the eleventh century. The colors of the characters now are a faded green, brown, blue and red. The background may have been colored (probably brownish-blue), but this is now undeterminable as it is almost completely faded out. Tapestry historian Hunter says the design is of Byzantine origin, however the weave indicates an occidental maker.

History 

Scholars place the area it was made in Cologne in the early part of the 11th century. The name for the tapestry is taken from the place of origin, the St. Gereon's Basilica in Cologne. It was hung in the church choir area.

The tapestry was cut into four fragments by the leading German art historian Dr. Franz Bock. These were then acquired in or around 1875 by four European museums. The fragments of the Cloth of Saint Gereon are located at the Museum of Decorative Arts in Lyon (one almost complete roundel with linking lion mask roundel), the Kunstgewerbe-Museum in Berlin, Germanisches Nationalmuseum in Nuremberg (two roundels of the main field, a top segment cut) and the Victoria and Albert Museum in London (bottom and right border).  A large part of the original is now in the museum at Lyon, while smaller parts are at Berlin and Nuremberg. There were several exhibition tours in Paris showing the Lyon museum fragment of the Cloth of St Gereon from 1989 to 1998.

See also

 Gereon
 St. Gereon's Basilica, Cologne, Germany
 Saint-Géréon, France

References

Sources 

 Anzovin, Steven, Famous First Facts 2000, item # 3084, H. W. Wilson Company, 
 Beach, Frederick Converse, The Americana: a universal reference library, comprising the arts and sciences, literature, history, biography, geography, commerce, etc., of the world, Volume 15 Oldest Tapestries, Scientific American Compiling Dept., 1908
 Guiffrey, Jules, Histoire de la tapisserie: depuis le moyen âge jusqu'à nos jours (French), A. Mame and son, 1886
 Hamlyn, Paul, Tapestries - Mercedes Viale, Fratelli Fabbri Editori, Milan 1966
 H.M.S.O., Victoria and Albert Museum, The tapestry collection: medieval and renaissance, by George Wingfield Digby, printed by Her Majesty's Stationery Office, London 1980
 Hunter, George Leland, Tapestries - their Origin, History and Renaissance, John Lane Company, 1912
 Stanford, Harold Melvin, The Standard reference work: for the home, school and library, Volume 7, Standard Education Society, 1921
 Thurstan, Violetta, A short history of decorative textiles and tapestries, Pepler & Sewell, 1934
 Viale, Mercedes, Tapestries - Cameo Series'', P. Hamlyn, 1969

Tapestries
Medieval textile design
Weaving
Cattle in art
Objects of the Berlin State Museums
Collections of the Victoria and Albert Museum
Collections of the Germanisches Nationalmuseum